Founded in 1999, LTU technologies is a company in the field of image recognition for commercial and government customers. The company provides technologies for image matching, similarity and color search for integration into applications for mobile, media intelligence and advertisement tracking, ecommerce and stock photography, brand and copyright protection, law enforcement and more.

LTU's patented technology originated in academic research at MIT, Oxford University and INRIA.

In 2005 LTU was acquired by JASTEC International, Inc., based in New York City.

References

External links
 LTU technologies
 Mobile visual search

Companies based in Paris
Software companies of France